Ancistrus maracasae is a species of catfish in the family Loricariidae. It is a freshwater fish native to the Caribbean, where it occurs in the basin of the Maracas River, which is a major tributary of the Caroni River in Trinidad and Tobago, indicating that it is endemic to the island of Trinidad. The species reaches 8.3 cm (3.3 inches) SL.

References 

maracasae
Fish of the Caribbean
Fish described in 1946